A mandarin was a bureaucrat scholar in the history of China, Korea and Vietnam.

The term is generally applied to the officials appointed through the imperial examination system; it sometimes includes the eunuchs also involved in the governance of the above realms.

History and use of the term
The English term comes from the Portuguese mandarim (spelled in Old Portuguese as mandarin). The Portuguese word was used in one of the earliest Portuguese reports about China: letters from the imprisoned survivors of the Tomé Pires' embassy, which were most likely written in 1524, and in Castanheda's História do descobrimento e conquista da Índia pelos portugueses (c. 1559). Matteo Ricci, who entered mainland China from Portuguese Macau in 1583, also said the Portuguese used the word.

The Portuguese word was thought by many to be related to mandador ("one who commands") and mandar ("to command"), from Latin mandare. Modern dictionaries, however, agree that it was in fact borrowed by Portuguese from the Malay menteri (in Jawi:) which ultimately came from the Sanskrit mantri (Devanagari: , meaning counselor or minister – etymologically linked to mantra). According to Malaysian scholar Ungku Abdul Aziz, the term had its origin when the Portuguese living in Malacca during the Malacca Sultanate wanted to meet with the higher officials in China and used the term "menteri", but with an added "n" because of their poor grasp of the language, to refer to higher officials.

In the 16th century, before the term mandarin became widespread in the European languages, the word Loutea (with various spelling variations) was often used in Europeans' travel reports to refer to Chinese scholar-officials. It is frequently used, for example, in Galeote Pereira's account of his experiences in China in 1548–1553, which was published in Europe in 1565, or (as Louthia) in Gaspar da Cruz' Treatise of China (1569). C. R. Boxer says the word comes from the Chinese 老爷 (Mandarin Pinyin: lǎoye; Amoy dialect: ló-tia; Quanzhou dialect: lāu-tia), which was commonly used by people in China to address officials. This is also the main term used to refer to the scholar-officials in Juan González de Mendoza's History of the Great and Mighty Kingdom of China and the Situation Thereof (1585), which heavily drew (directly or indirectly) on Pereira's report and Gaspar da Cruz' book and which was the Europeans' standard reference on China in the late 16th century.

In the West, the term mandarin is associated with the concept of the scholar-official who immersed himself in poetry, literature, and Confucian learning in addition to performing civil service duties. In modern English, mandarin is also used to refer to any (though usually a senior) civil servant, often in a satirical context, particularly in the United Kingdom and Commonwealth countries.

The speech standard of the Ming and Qing empires was called "Mandarin language" by European missionaries, translating the Chinese name Guanhua ("the language of the officials") for this speech standard, which was current already in the Ming dynasty. The term "Mandarin" is also used to refer to modern Standard Chinese, which evolved out of the earlier standard, and to the broader group of Mandarin dialects spoken across northern and southwestern China.

History
In China, from 605 to 1905, mandarins were selected by merit through the extremely rigorous imperial examination. China has had civil servants since at least the Zhou dynasty. However, most high ranking positions were filled by relatives of the sovereign and the nobility. It was not until the Tang dynasty when imperial examination replaced the nine-rank system and the final form of the mandarin was completed. Mandarins were the founders and core of the Chinese gentry. A governmental office (for example, a central government department or a provincial civil governorate) headed by a mandarin is called a yamen. The mandarins were replaced with a modern civil service after the fall of the Qing dynasty. During the Qing dynasty, the governor of a Chinese province was signified by wearing a mandarin hat-pin made of ruby. The lower ranks of mandarins were signified by hat-pins made of coral, sapphire, lapis lazuli, white jade, gold, and silver.

After becoming free of Chinese rule and setting up its own independent monarchy, Vietnam emulated the Chinese system of mandarins in its civil service. The last mandarins in history were in service of the State of Vietnam (1949–1955). The Confucian examination system in Vietnam was established in 1075 under the Lý dynasty Emperor Lý Nhân Tông and lasted until the Nguyễn dynasty Emperor Khải Định (1919). Elephants were used to guard the examination halls until 1843 when the emperor said it was no longer necessary.

Korea adopted the civil services examinations called Gwageo under the Goryeo and Joseon dynasties. Based on the civil service examinations of imperial China, the gwageo first arose in Unified Silla, gained importance in Goryeo, and were the centerpiece of most education in the Joseon dynasty. The tutelage provided at the hyanggyo, seowon, and Sungkyunkwan was aimed primarily at preparing students for the gwageo and their subsequent career in government service. Under Joseon law, high office was closed to those who were not children of officials of the second full rank or higher (Yangban), unless the candidate had passed the gwageo. Those who passed the higher literary examination came to monopolize all of the dynasty's high positions of state.

Ranks under the Qing dynasty

The Qing dynasty (1644–1912) divided the bureaucracy into civil and military positions, both having nine grades or ranks, each subdivided into primary and secondary categories. Civil appointments ranged from attendant to the emperor or a Grand Secretary in the Forbidden City (highest) to being a county magistrate, prefectural tax collector, deputy jail warden, deputy police commissioner or tax examiner. Military appointments ranged from being a field marshal or chamberlain of the imperial bodyguard to a third class sergeant, corporal or a first or second class private.

In the table below, "na" is shorthand for the "nth rank, primary" (正n品), which is a higher sub-rank than "nth rank, secondary" (從n品), denoted as "nb" in the table.

See also

 Yangban – the traditional ruling class or gentry of dynastic Korea during the Joseon dynasty
 Kapitan Cina – the Chinese officership or mandarinate of colonial Indonesia
 Cabang Atas – the Chinese gentry of colonial Indonesia

References

External links

Government of Imperial China
Joseon dynasty
Nguyen dynasty
History of Imperial China
Public administration